Clifton Observatory is a former mill, now used as an observatory, located on Clifton Down, close to the Clifton Suspension Bridge, Bristol, England.

The building was erected, with the permission of the Society of Merchant Venturers, as a windmill for corn in 1766 and later converted to the grinding of snuff, when it became known as 'The Snuff Mill'. This was damaged by fire on 30 October 1777, when the sails were left turning during a gale and caused the equipment to catch alight. It was then derelict for 52 years until in 1828 William West, an artist, rented the old mill, for 5 shillings (25p) a year, as a studio.

In 1977, the Merchant Venturers sold the observatory to Honorbrook Inns; however, they were obliged to maintain public access to the camera obscura whose ownership was retained by the Merchant Venturers.

It has been designated by English Heritage as a grade II* listed building and is on the Buildings at Risk Register. In February 2015 the Observatory was bought by Ian Johnson, a local Clifton-born entrepreneur, who also owns the Clifton Rocks Railway and the Wellhead cocktail bar.

Camera obscura
West installed telescopes and a camera obscura, which were used by artists of the Bristol School to draw the Avon Gorge and Leigh Woods on the opposite side. Many examples of these paintings can be seen in Bristol City Museum and Art Gallery.  The pictures which originated from images within the camera obscura he called 'photogenic drawing' and were based on the work of William Fox Talbot.

A 5" (13 cm) convex lens and sloping mirror were installed on the top of the tower; these project the panoramic view vertically downward into the darkened room below. Visitors view the true image (not a mirror image) on a fixed circular table 5 feet (1.5m) in diameter, with a concave metal surface, and turn the mirror by hand to change the direction of view. It has been placed on the top of Clifton Tower since 1828.

Cave

This cave was first mentioned as being a chapel in the year AD 305 and excavations, in which Romano-British pottery has been found, have revealed that it has been both a holy place and a place of refuge at various times in its history. Although the cave is in limestone, there are few formations in the natural passages.

See also
 Grade II* listed buildings in Bristol
 The Downs (Bristol)

References

External links

 Clifton Observatory

Industrial buildings completed in 1766
Grade II* listed buildings in Bristol
Structures on the Heritage at Risk register
The Downs, Bristol
Camera obscuras
Buildings and structures in Clifton, Bristol
Observation towers in the United Kingdom